Tengku Ampuan Afzan Hospital is a hospital in Kuantan, Pahang, Malaysia. The hospital began operation in 1983.

References

See also
 List of hospitals in Malaysia

Hospital buildings completed in 1983
Hospitals in Pahang
Hospitals established in 1983
Kuantan
1983 establishments in Malaysia
20th-century architecture in Malaysia